Wild Country is a 1947 American Western film directed by Ray Taylor.

Plot

Cast 
Eddie Dean as Marshal Eddie Dean
Flash as Flash
Roscoe Ates as Soapy Jones
Peggy Wynne as Martha Devery
Douglas Fowley as Clark Varney
I. Stanford Jolley as Rip Caxton
Lee Roberts as Sheriff Josh Huckings
Forrest Matthews as Henchman Sam
William Fawcett as Lawyer Joe Spindle
Henry Hall as Marshal Harlan G. Thayer
Charles Jordan as Convict Brown
Richard Cramer as Guard #1
Gus Taute as Dilling
The Sunshine Boys as Singing Cowhands

Soundtrack 
 Eddie Dean with The Sunshine Boys - "Wild Country" (Written by Eddie Dean and Hal Blair)
 Eddie Dean with The Sunshine Boys - "Saddle With a Golden Horn" (Written by Pete Gates)
 Eddie Dean with The Sunshine Boys - "Ain't No Gal Got a Brand On Me" (Written by Pete Gates)

External links 

1947 films
1947 Western (genre) films
1940s action adventure films
American black-and-white films
Producers Releasing Corporation films
American Western (genre) films
Films scored by Karl Hajos
Films directed by Ray Taylor
1940s English-language films
1940s American films